Africana: The Encyclopedia of the African and African-American Experience edited by Henry Louis Gates and 
Anthony Appiah  (Basic Civitas Books  1999, 2nd ed. Oxford University Press, 2005) is a compendium of Africana studies including African studies and the "Pan-African diaspora" inspired by W. E. B. Du Bois' project of an Encyclopedia Africana. Du Bois envisioned "an Encyclopedia Africana," which was to be "unashamedly Afro-Centric but not indifferent to the impact of the outside world."

The first edition appeared in a single volume, of which about a third each was dedicated to North American African-American studies, to Afro-Latin American topics of Latin America and the Caribbean and to Africa proper. The second edition was published by Oxford University Press in five volumes, including more than 3500 entries on 3960 pages.

W. E. B. Du Bois and the Encyclopedia Africana

Daniel Alexander Payne Murray was one of the first African-Americans to work as a librarian at the Library of Congress in 1871. In 1899 Murray organized an exhibit at the 1900 Paris Exposition on Negro authors. Under his direction, his award-winning exhibit became the core of the Library of Congress's Colored Author Collection. Murray planned to expand his collection and create an encyclopedia of African-American achievement. Although he never completed the project, the idea of an encyclopedia that explored the black experience was revived and expanded by W. E. B. Du Bois. In 1901 Du Bois widened the scope of the project to encompass the entire African diaspora. He suggested that the encyclopedia be called the Encyclopedia Africana in a similar fashion to the Encyclopædia Britannica. Du Bois envisioned a scientific and comprehensive work on Africa and peoples of African descent that would refute the Enlightenment notion of blacks as devoid of civilization and the hallmarks of humanity.  Due to lack of support from the established philanthropies, the project died.

See also
Afrocentricity
Africana studies
African studies
African American studies
Encarta (distributed and later incorporated the on-line version, Encarta Africana)

References

Jay Spaulding, The International Journal of African Historical Studies (2001), 147f.

External links
 Oxford University Press Information about the five-volume set from the publisher.

African studies
1999 non-fiction books
Books about Africa
Encyclopedias of culture and ethnicity
African encyclopedias
20th-century encyclopedias
21st-century encyclopedias